William Frederick Cirkel (November 14, 1857 – May 17, 1893) was an American politician and businessman.

Cirkel was born in Appleton, Wisconsin. He went to Lawrence University. Cirkel owned a stave factory in Seymour, Wisconsin and served as mayor from 1882 to 1884. In 1885 and 1886, Cirkel served in the Wisconsin Assembly as a Democrat. In 1887, Cirkel moved to Cadott, Wisconsin where he established a stave factory. Cirkel died at his home from coal gas that was leaking in his room.

Notes

1857 births
1893 deaths
Politicians from Appleton, Wisconsin
People from Seymour, Wisconsin
Lawrence University alumni
Businesspeople from Wisconsin
Mayors of places in Wisconsin
Accidental deaths in Wisconsin
People from Chippewa County, Wisconsin
19th-century American politicians
19th-century American businesspeople
Democratic Party members of the Wisconsin State Assembly